The 2019–20 Montenegrin Second League was the 14th season since the establishment of the Montenegrin Second League. The season ran from August 2019 to July 2020. That was the second season with 10 participating teams.

Format of competition
A total of 10 teams participate in this edition of the Second League. The new members are Lovćen and Mornar, who were relegated from 2018–19 Montenegrin First League, and winners of Montenegrin Third League playoffs - Ibar and Drezga.

This was the second season of Second CFL with 10 participants. At the end of the season, the winner is automatically promoted to Montenegrin First League, while 2nd and 3rd placed teams play promotion play-offs, while 9th and 10th position lead to relegation to the Montenegrin Third League.

Teams
The following 10 clubs compete in this season.

League table

Results

First half of the season

Second half of the season

Promotion play-offs
The 3rd-placed team (against the 10th-placed team of the First League) and the runners-up (against the 11th-placed team of the First League) will both compete in two-legged promotion play-offs after the end of the season.

Summary

|}

Matches

Jezero won 3–2 on aggregate.

1–1 on aggregate. OFK Titograd won on penalties.

Top scorers

References

External links
Football Association of Montenegro - Official Site

Montenegrin Second League seasons
Montenegro
2019–20 in Montenegrin football
Montenegro